Galudih is a village in the Ghatshila CD block in the Ghatshila subdivision of the East Singhbhum district, Jharkhand, India.

Geography

Location 

Galudih Barrage
The  Galudih barrage across the Subarnarekha is a part of the Subarnarekha Multipurpose Project, which is a joint venture of the states of  Bihar (later Jharkhand), West Bengal and Odisha. The barrage diverts water into canals on both sides of the river. Chandil Dam is also a part pf this project. Burudi Lake is about 4 km away.

Area overview 
The area shown in the map “forms a part of the Chota Nagpur Plateau and is a hilly upland tract”.  The main rivers draining the district are the Subarnarekha and the Kharkai. The area lying between Jamshedpur and Ghatshila is the main industrial mining zone. The rest of the district is primarily agricultural. In the district, as of 2011,  56.9% of the population lives in the rural areas and a high 43.1% lives in the urban areas.

Note: The map alongside presents some of the notable locations in the district. All places marked in the map are linked in the larger full screen map.

Civic administration   
There is a police station at Galudih.

Demographics 
According to the 2011 Census of India, Galudi had a total population of 311, of which 163 (52%) were males and 148 (48%) were females. Population in the age range 0–6 years was 46. The total number of literate persons in Galudi was 158 (59.62% of the population over 6 years).

(*For language details see Ghatshila block#Language and religion)

Transport 
Galudih railway station is on the Kharagpur-Tatanagar line.

References 

Villages in East Singhbhum district